On Friday, May 5, 1961, a strong tornado impacted the city of St. Petersburg, Florida. The tornado, which only touched down briefly, was estimated to have produced F2 damage on the Fujita scale. It struck the Northeast High School and the nearby Meadowlawn neighborhood in the extreme northern part of St. Petersburg, traveling  and producing a  path. The tornado was part of a much larger outbreak sequence that produced 73 tornadoes. The parent thunderstorm that spawned the tornado was also attended by  hail.

Meteorological synopsis
On Friday, May 5, 1961, weather forecasters and surface weather maps indicated that a warm front was to lift northward over the Florida peninsula. As the front moved north, a warm, moist air mass expanded over the southern two-thirds of the state. At 5:00 p.m. local time, severe storms developed over the Tampa Bay Area.

Storm development, track, and impact
Shortly after 5:00 p.m., a tornado touched down at 1155 53rd Avenue North in northern St. Petersburg. There, the tornado unroofed a home, bending a television antenna and dropping it on an automobile. Next, the tornado moved northwestward to 5445 16th Street North, where it unroofed a second home. After striking the two homes, the tornado hit the campus of Northeast High School. According to then school principal John Sexton, the tornado unroofed a triangular portion of the tar paper roof that covered the north wing of the school, exposing three rooms to rain. However, because school had ended for the day, no students were inside, and no injuries were reported. Nearby observers reported garbage cans and beach balls flying through the air. The tornado apparently dissipated after hitting the school, as no further damage was noted, though power in the nearby Meadowlawn neighborhood was out at 5:30 p.m. Losses were estimated at $25,000.

Non-tornadic effects
In addition to the tornado, severe thunderstorm winds unroofed a home at 245 78th Avenue North, near Fossil Park.

See also
List of tornadoes and tornado outbreaks
List of North American tornadoes and tornado outbreaks
Tornado outbreak of April 4–5, 1966 – Generated devastating tornadoes over the Tampa Bay Area

Notes

References

Sources

St. Petersburg Tornado, 1961|S
1961 tornado
S
S
S
May 1961 events in the United States
1961 natural disasters in the United States
F2 tornadoes by date
F2 tornadoes by location